Pursuit of the Sun & Allure of the Earth is the first full-length album and second studio release by the Canadian black metal band Woods of Ypres. It was recorded in 2004 at Spectre Sound in Tecumseh, Ontario. This marked Woods of Ypres' first release with David Gold on vocals and guitar as well as drums, along with the first appearance of keyboardist Jessica Rose. Steve Jones and Connor Sharpe supplied most of the lead guitar and bass work for this album, but were uncredited in the album booklet due to leaving Woods of Ypres before its release.

Four songs from this album were later re-issued in Woods of Ypres' 2009 compilation CD Independent Nature 2002-2007. That same year, the band re-released their song Allure of the Earth from this album as a vinyl-only single, accompanied by a cover of it by Australian cellists Sebastian Simpson and Chris Doig.

Songs from this album were not a frequent sight at recent Woods of Ypres concerts. Only "The Sun Was in My Eyes (Part I)" has been documented as a full setlist addition since 2009, though shortened versions of "Summer's Envy" and "The Ghosts of Summers Past" have been played in a medley style occasionally in the band's later years.

Track listing

Personnel
Woods of Ypres
 David Gold – vocals, drums, guitars, bass
 Jessica Rose – keyboard
 Steve Jones – guitar
 Connor Sharpe – bass

Additional personnel
 Sarah Green – backing vocals on "The Ghosts of Summers Past" and "Outro: The End of August"
 Glenn Fricker - Engineer

References

2004 debut albums
Woods of Ypres albums